Donald B. Samuelson (born August 23, 1932, in Brainerd, Minnesota) is a Minnesota legislator and a former President of the Minnesota Senate. A bricklayer by trade, Samuelson was first elected to the Minnesota House of Representatives in 1968, where he served seven terms. In November 1982, he won election to the Minnesota Senate.

In the Senate, Samuelson served as chair of the Health and Human Services Finance subcommittee, and in 2001, he was selected to serve as the body's president.

Samuelson retired from the legislature in 2003.

References

1932 births
Living people
People from Brainerd, Minnesota
Presidents of the Minnesota Senate
Democratic Party Minnesota state senators
Democratic Party members of the Minnesota House of Representatives
21st-century American politicians